Alum Spring is a historic sulphur spring located at Catherine Lake, Onslow County, North Carolina. The spring was the site of the county poorhouse during the post-American Civil War period.  After the poorhouse moved, the county-wide "Big August" picnic social gathering was held at Alum Spring until 1933.

It was listed on the National Register of Historic Places in 1990.

References

Event venues on the National Register of Historic Places in North Carolina
Buildings and structures in Onslow County, North Carolina
National Register of Historic Places in Onslow County, North Carolina